Muara Library is a public library located in Muara in Brunei-Muara District, Brunei.

History 
The laying of foundation stone for the library building was held in a ceremony on 13 May 2004, which was officiated by the then Minister of Culture, Youth and Sports, . Its construction was completed by the following year, and the library was inaugurated on 8 December 2005 by the succeeding Minister, .

References 

Dewan Bahasa dan Pustaka Library
Libraries in Brunei
Brunei-Muara District
Libraries established in 2005
2005 establishments in Brunei